Cerdulatinib is a small molecule SYK/JAK kinase inhibitor in development for treatment of hematological malignancies. It has lowest nM IC50 values against TYK2, JAK1, JAK2, JAK3, FMS, and SYK.

It is being developed by Portola Pharmaceuticals; in September 2018 the FDA granted orphan drug status to cerdulatinib for the treatment of peripheral T-cell lymphoma (PTCL).

See also 
 Ruxolitinib
 Fostamatinib
 Entospletinib

References 

Experimental cancer drugs
Protein kinase inhibitors
Aminopyrimidines